Nellikudur is a village in Mahabubabad district of the Indian state of Telangana. It is the mandal headquarters of Nellikudur mandal. It is administered under Thorrur revenue division.
Nellikudur is beautiful village, this village located 20 more thadas located in the village. Nellikuduru has one of the biggest function hall M.K.R Gardens  in nearby cities.

Geography
Nellikudur is situated between Thorrur and Mahbubabad towns of Mahabubabad district.  It is situated at a distance of 14 kilometers from Thorrur and 27 kilometers from Mahbubabad.

Bhramana Kothapally is a village located at river of akeru is biggest sub river of Krishna, new bridge was built to connect Nellikudur village and Bhramanakothapally.

Every year in Bhramanakothapally village celebrated festival in temple Sri Santhana Venugopala Swamy 
this temple established in 1200-year-old temple. Madhanaturthy Village is 7 km from Nellikudur.

References

Villages in Mahabubabad district
Mandals in Mahabubabad district